Nathan David Perlman (August 2, 1887 – June 29, 1952) was an American lawyer and politician from New York.

Life
Born in Prusice, Poland, Perlman immigrated to the United States in 1891 with his mother where they settled in New York City. After attending the city's public schools he pursued higher education by attending College of the City of New York; and New York University Law School. Perlman graduated from law school in 1907, was admitted to the bar in 1909, and practiced law in New York City.

Perlman was a Special Deputy New York Attorney General from 1912 to 1914; and a member of the New York State Assembly (New York Co., 6th D.) in 1915, 1916 and 1917.

He was elected as a Republican to the 66th United States Congress to fill the vacancy caused by the resignation of Fiorello H. La Guardia. Perlman was re-elected to the 67th, 68th and 69th United States Congresses, holding office from November 2, 1920, to March 3, 1927.

Afterwards Perlman resumed the practice of law. He was a delegate to the New York State Convention to enact the 21st Amendment, and then became a New York City Magistrate serving from May 1, 1935, to September 1, 1936.

Perlman wanted to disrupt rallies in New York organized by the German American Bund, but could not find any legal means or justification to do so. Setting the law aside, Perlman then conspired with the organized crime figure Meyer Lansky to violently attack the rallies using Jewish mobsters. These attacks went on for months.

At the New York state election, 1936, he ran on the Republican ticket for New York Attorney General but was defeated by the incumbent John J. Bennett, Jr. He was then appointed as a justice of the Court of Special Sessions of the City of New York on November 26, 1936, and was re-appointed on July 1, 1945.

Perlman was a senior official of the American Jewish Congress and, in 1945, consulted with and provided assistance to U.S. Supreme Court Justice Robert H. Jackson, President Truman's appointee to serve as chief U.S. prosecutor of Nazi war criminals.

Perlman died at Beth Israel Hospital in New York City, and was buried at Mount Hebron Cemetery in Queens.

See also
List of Jewish members of the United States Congress

References

Sources

External links
 Jewish Gangsters
 

1887 births
1952 deaths
Jewish members of the United States House of Representatives
New York University School of Law alumni
Republican Party members of the New York State Assembly
American people of Polish-Jewish descent
Politicians from New York City
New York (state) state court judges
Republican Party members of the United States House of Representatives from New York (state)
20th-century American judges
Lawyers from New York City
20th-century American politicians
20th-century American lawyers
Burials at Mount Hebron Cemetery (New York City)
People from Trzebnica County
Polish emigrants to the United States
American Jewish Congress